Stop That Cab is a 1951 American comedy film directed by Eugenio de Liguoro.

Plot

The trials and tribulations of a cab driver working the night shift, who must put with an assortment of crazies, hard cases and sob stories during work and then has to come home to a loud, argumentative, shrewish wife.

Cast
Sid Melton as Sidney Gugenheimer
Iris Adrian as Lucy
Marjorie Lord as Mary Thomas
Tom Neal as Lefty
William Haade as Onslow
Greg McClure as George
Chester Clute as Lucy's Father
Minerva Urecal as Lucy's Mother
Mario Siletti as Giuseppe Moscadella
Renata Vanni as Josephine Moscadella
Jess Kirkpatrick as Newsboy

External links

Stop That Cab at TCMDB
Stop That Cab at BFI

1951 films
American comedy films
Films directed by Eugenio de Liguoro
1951 comedy films
Lippert Pictures films
American black-and-white films
1950s English-language films
1950s American films